Holtwood, Pennsylvania is an unincorporated community in Martic Township, Lancaster County, in the U.S. state of Pennsylvania.

Holtwood is the site of the Muddy Run Pumped Storage Hydroelectric Power Plant (172 Bethesda Church Road West, Holtwood, PA 17532), along the Susquehanna River. It pumps water into a reservoir during off-peak hours and uses that water to generate electricity during peak demand hours; it produces over 1,000 megawatts (MW) of power.

References

External links 
Community profile

Unincorporated communities in Lancaster County, Pennsylvania
Unincorporated communities in Pennsylvania

pdc:Intercourse, Pennsilfaani